Edward Kevin O'Neill (20 March 1908 – 12 July 1985) was an Australian rules footballer who played in the VFL between 1930 and 1941 for the Richmond Football Club.

The son of a former Richmond player from its days in the VFA, O'Neill was a member of the Tigers' legendary "Three Musketeers" backline of Bolger, Sheahan and O'Neill.  He played in  four straight senior Grand Finals from 1931 to 1934, winning the premiership in 1932 and 1934.  He also played in Richmond's losing Grand Final side of 1940.

O'Neill represented Victoria on ten occasions, as State vice-captain for an Interstate Carnival, and was awarded Life Membership of the Richmond Football Club in 1939.

During the Second World War he served in the RAAF.

He returned to the Tigers briefly in 1944 as Captain/Coach of the Seconds side.

References

External links
 
 

Richmond Football Club players
Richmond Football Club Premiership players
Echuca Football Club players
Australian rules footballers from Victoria (Australia)
1908 births
1985 deaths
Royal Australian Air Force personnel of World War II
Two-time VFL/AFL Premiership players
People from Echuca
Military personnel from Victoria (Australia)